Sluice Creek is a  tributary of Dennis Creek in Cape May County, New Jersey in the United States.

See also
List of rivers of New Jersey
Roaring Ditch

References

External links
 U.S. Geological Survey: NJ stream gaging stations

Rivers of Cape May County, New Jersey
Rivers of New Jersey
Tributaries of Delaware Bay